Sarah Anne Dorsey (née Ellis; February 16, 1829 – July 4, 1879) was an American novelist and historian from the prominent southern Percy family. She published several novels and a highly regarded biography of Henry Watkins Allen, governor of Louisiana during the years of the American Civil War. It is considered an important contribution to the literature of the Lost Cause.

By 1876 Dorsey was a widow and, when learning of Jefferson Davis' misfortunes, she invited him to visit her plantation of Beauvoir and use a cottage. He ended up living there the rest of his life, and their friendship created a scandal, but both ignored it, and his second wife, Varina Davis, also came to stay. In 1878, Dorsey realized she was terminally ill, rewrote her will, and bequeathed her property to Jefferson Davis. He wrote his history of the Civil War there and began his autobiography.

Biography
Sarah Anne Ellis was born to Mary Malvina Routh and Thomas George Percy Ellis.

Sarah Anne Ellis was the niece of Catherine Anne Warfield and Eleanor Percy Lee, the "Two Sisters of the West," who while young published two volumes of poetry together. Catherine Anne Warfield went on to publish a number of novels, which achieved significant popular acclaim, including The House of Bouverie, a gothic fiction in two volumes, which was a bestseller in 1860. She and Ellis became quite close after her sister Eleanor died in 1849, with Sarah Anne encouraging her to write again.

Sarah Anne's father died when she was nine. Her widowed mother Mary soon remarried to Charles Gustavus Dahlgren, of Swedish descent. Her stepfather, who saw great potential in Sarah, provided her with a first-rate education, engaging as her tutor Eliza Ann Dupuy, the same woman who had inspired and trained her aunts Catherine and Eleanor. Later, about 1838–1841, he sent her to Madame Deborah Grelaud's French School in Philadelphia, Pennsylvania, founded in the 1790s by a refugee from the French Revolution. Mme Grelaud was a Huguenot, and the school was Episcopal. There Sarah excelled in music, painting, dancing, and languages, quickly gaining fluency in Italian, Spanish, German and French.

At the school, she met the older Varina Banks Howell, whom she would meet later in life again as the wife of Jefferson Davis. During her studies in Philadelphia, Ellis found her most exciting teacher to be Anne Charlotte Lynch. (Later after her marriage, Anne Lynch Botta started the first and most famous salon in Manhattan of the 19th century.

She wrote the Handbook of Universal Literature (1860), which remained in print for fifty years. At her salon, the circle of intellectuals included Horace Greeley, William Cullen Bryant, and Ralph Waldo Emerson. She frequently welcomed visitors such as Anthony Trollope, Charles Dickens, and Charles Kingsley).

Marriage and family
In 1852, Ellis married Samuel Worthington Dorsey, an older man who was a member of a prominent Maryland family. His father Thomas Beale Dorsey had accumulated large cotton plantations in the Tensas Parish region, which Samuel inherited.  Between the Dahlgren-Routh-Ellis plantations on Sarah's side and Samuel's plantations, the newlyweds were rich. They settled first in Maryland but moved to a Routh family plantation near Newellton in Tensas Parish, Louisiana.

Literary career
Casting about for purpose as a wealthy plantation owner, Dorsey wrote articles for the New York Churchman in the 1850s. She published her first fictional work in 1863–1864 in the Southern Literary Messenger, which serialized her novel Agnes Graham, which featured a heroine modeled on herself. The romantic novel had a young woman fall in love with her cousin, whom she plans to marry until she learns about their common blood line. The success of the serials prompted her aunt Catherine's Philadelphia publisher, Claxton, Remsen and Haffelfinger, to republish the work in book form after the war. Other fictional works of Dorsey include Lucia Dare (1867), with a heroine modeled on her own experiences in fleeing Louisiana for Texas during the war. Its descriptions were considered harrowing by contemporary readers. She also completed Athalie (1872), and Panola (1877).

In 1866, Dorsey had published a biography of Henry Watkins Allen, the wartime governor of Louisiana. They had first met in 1859, when both the Dorseys and Allen were traveling in the Rhine River Valley in Europe. She also used her study as a way to evaluate the role of women in the southern male-dominated society. She admired Allen's work: "As a leader of wartime relief for the poor, an advocate of emancipation for slaves as reward for Confederate service, and other bold if not always welcomed innovations, Allen much deserved her praise." The highly regarded work is considered to be an important contribution to the Lost Cause legend of southern memory.

In 1873, the Dorseys moved to Beauvoir, a plantation near Mississippi City, now Biloxi, overlooking the Gulf of Mexico.

Later years
Soon after her husband died in 1875, Dorsey learned that Jefferson Davis, the former president of the Confederacy, was ill and bankrupt. She invited him to visit at the plantation in December 1876. Davis had been married since 1845 to his second wife, Varina Howell Davis, but they had suffered difficulties. (As a girl, Varina had also attended Madame Grelaud's French school.) 

Impoverished after his imprisonment, the Davises had been living with their eldest daughter and her family in Memphis, Tennessee. Davis moved into Beauvoir on a permanent basis, where Dorsey provided him with a cottage on the grounds for his use.

There he began to write his memoir, The Rise and Fall of the Confederate Government. Dorsey was instrumental in his success, organizing his day, motivating him to work, taking dictation, transcribing notes, editing and offering advice. Rumors quickly began to fly that the two were having an illicit affair, and it was nearly "an open scandal," but they refused to yield to it. Varina Davis became enraged and refused for a long time to set foot on Dorsey's property. Eventually she accepted Dorsey's invitation to live there and moved into one of the guest cottages at Beauvoir.

When the Davises' last surviving son Jefferson Davis, Jr. died in 1878, the loss devastated both his parents. Varina Davis warmed to Dorsey's hospitality. That summer, Sarah Dorsey nursed Varina through a long debilitating illness. Soon afterward, Sarah Dorsey learned that she had inoperable tumors in her breast. As her health declined, Varina Davis became her primary nurse.

Death
Recognizing that she was dying, Dorsey rewrote her will in 1878. She bequeathed all her capital, and more importantly Beauvoir, to Jefferson Davis. Dorsey died in the St. Charles Hotel in New Orleans on July 4, 1879, at the age of 50. She had undergone an unsuccessful operation for cancer performed by Dr. T. G. Richardson, assisted by Dr. Rudolph Matas.

Legacy
The Percy family sued but failed to break the will. After Jefferson Davis' death in 1889, Beauvoir was adapted as a home for Confederate veterans. Many were buried after their deaths in the cemetery behind the house. After the last veteran died, the property was adapted as a house museum.

Works
 Agnes Graham (1863–1864), serialized in the Southern Literary Messenger
 Biography of Henry Watkins Allen (1866), governor of Louisiana
 Lucia Dare (1867)
 Athalie (1872)
 Panola (1877)

Percy writers
Kate Lee Ferguson
Eleanor Percy Lee
Walker Percy
William Alexander Percy
William Armstrong Percy, III
Catherine Anne Warfield

Other Percys
LeRoy Percy
Thomas George Percy

References

Citations

Bibliography

 Louisiana Historical Association, "Dorsey, Sarah Anne Ellis" Notable American Women, Vol. 1, 4th ed., The Belknap Press of Harvard University Press, 1975
 Wyatt-Brown Bertram, The Literary Percys: Family History, Gender & The Southern Imagination, Mercer University Lamar Memorial Lecture, University of Georgia Press, 1994

1829 births
1879 deaths
People from Natchez, Mississippi
People from Biloxi, Mississippi
People from Newellton, Louisiana
19th-century American historians
Deaths from cancer in Louisiana
Deaths from breast cancer
American women historians
Historians from Louisiana
Historians from Mississippi
19th-century American women writers
Dorsey family of Maryland
Percy family of Mississippi
American salon-holders